"Don't Need You To (Tell Me I'm Pretty)" is a song by Irish singer Samantha Mumba. The single was released exclusively in the United States as Mumba's second single, and as the fourth overall single from her debut studio album Gotta Tell You (2000) on 4 September 2001. "Don't Need You To (Tell Me I'm Pretty)" was also the official second single to be released from the original motion picture soundtrack to Legally Blonde. The song peaked at #40 on Radio & Records CHR/Pop Chart on 8/24/01. The song peaked at number 20 on the US Billboard Hot Singles Sales chart.

Track listing
US single
 "Don't Need You To (Tell Me I'm Pretty)" – 3:46
 "The Boy" (Remix) – 4:03

Cover versions
In 2006, Danish singer Natasha Thomas covered and recorded the song as "I Don't Need You To" for her second studio album Playin' with Fire.

References

2000 songs
2001 singles
A&M Records singles
Samantha Mumba songs
Songs written by Diane Warren